Kallos, Kallós, and Kalloś may refer to:

People
Ashley Kallos, Canadian curler 
Ben Kallos, American lawyer and politician
Ede Kallós, Hungarian sculptor
Garry Kallos (born 1956), Canadian wrestler and sambo competitor
Sándor Kallós, Ukrainian composer

Other uses
 Kalište (Slovakia), a former village

See also
 Kallø, a brand name of Royal Wessanen
 Kallósd, a village in Zala County, Hungary
 Renata Kallosh (born 1943), theoretical physicist